Randall MacDonnell, 1st Marquess of Antrim (1609–1683) was a Roman Catholic landed magnate in Scotland and Ireland, son of the 1st Earl of Antrim. He was also chief of Clan MacDonnell of Antrim. He is best known for his involvement, mostly on the Royalist side, in the Wars of the Three Kingdoms.

Birth and origins 
Randal was born on 9 June 1609, probably at Dunluce Castle, his parents' habitual residence. He was the eldest son of Randal MacDonnell and his wife, Alice O'Neill. His father, Lord of the Route and Constable of Dunluce Castle, had been knighted by Lord Lieutenant Mountjoy in 1602. His father was an important landowner in the north-eastern corner of Ireland facing Scotland across the North Channel. His father's family, the MacDonnell of Antrim, were the Irish branch of the Scottish Clan Donald. The MacDonnels descended from the twelfth-century Scottish warlord Somerled and from Alexander MacDonald, 5th of Dunnyveg, a Scottish-Irish magnate, who was driven out of Scotland by James IV and fled to Ulster where the family was already established through a series of marriages. His Scottish lands were taken over by the rival Clan Campbell, although the MacDonalds continued to live there and looked towards the MacDonnell family for leadership. Recovering his Scottish lands remained an objective that his father pursued all his life without ever meeting it.

Randal's mother was described as "of good cheerful aspect, freckled, not tall but strong, well set, and acquainted with the English tongue." She was born in 1583 as the daughter of Hugh O'Neill, Earl of Tyrone and his second wife, Siobhan (i.e. Joan) O'Donnell. She was thus a member of the O'Neill dynasty, an ancient Gaelic family, the leaders of which were once kings and ruled all of Ulster. However, her father had left Ireland in the Flight of the Earls in 1607 and was then attainted by the Irish Parliament, losing his title and lands.

Randal's parents were both Catholic. They had married in 1604 before the Flight of the Earls. Unlike most of the Ulster Catholic elite, the MacDonnells benefited financially from the Plantation of Ulster, which brought large-scale Scottish and English settlement of Northern Ireland. In spite of this, and their good relations with their Protestant neighbours and tenants, the MacDonnell's remained staunch Catholics.

He appears below as the elder of two brothers:
Randal (1609–1683)
Alexander (1615–1699), succeeded him as the 3rd Earl

Early life 
On 28 May 1618 Randal's father was created Viscount Dunluce and in 1620 1st Earl of Antrim by King James I of England. By the latter creation Viscount Dunluce became a subsidiary title of the family, which was given as courtesy title to Randal, aged 11, the Earl's eldest son and heir apparent, who was therefore styled Viscount Dunluce.

Although the family was part of an increasingly Anglicised Irish elite, he was exposed to Gaelic culture, Gaelic language, and raised as a staunch Catholic. In 1613, when he was four, an arranged marriage was made for him with Lucy Hamilton, a daughter of James Hamilton, 1st Earl of Abercorn, but the wedding never took place.

France and England 
In 1625 Dunluce, as he was now, travelled to France to complete his education. After two years there he went to London, where he was presented at the court of Charles I. He was described as "a tall, clean-limbed, handsome man with red hair". Dunluce spent the next ten years in England, with only occasional, brief visits to Ireland. In 1635 he began a career as a military contractor by agreeing to raise two regiments of Irish troops for service in the French army, but the plan was vetoed by the King.

First marriage 
After abandoning his long-standing fiancée Lucy Hamilton, Dunluce was linked with several other prospective marriages. In 1635 he married Katherine Manners, the widow of George Villiers, 1st Duke of Buckingham, who had been England's Chief Minister under both James I and Charles before his assassination in 1628. The Duchess was a devout Catholic and wealthy. She was close to Queen Henrietta Maria, and further enhanced Dunluce's status at court. He became friends with leading British politicians including the Earl of Nithsdale, the Duke of Lennox and the Duke of Hamilton.

Dunluce planned to acquire large amounts of land in the Londonderry Plantation, but this was blocked by Thomas Wentworth, the Lord Deputy of Ireland, who mistrusted Dunluce and was to become a major opponent of his. Dunluce also made a failed attempt to recover some of the family's traditional lands in the West of Scotland by purchasing them, but this also fell through.

Dunluce was emotionally very close to his wife and became stepfather to her children including George Villiers, 2nd Duke of Buckingham. The couple lived a lavish lifestyle, and Dunluce ran up large debts in England which troubled him for the rest of his life.

Earl of Antrim 
On 10 December 1636 Dunluce's father died in Dunluce Castle and was buried at the Bonamargy Franciscan Friary. Dunluce succeeded as the 2nd Earl of Antrim. In his will, his father had divided his estate between his two sons. Randal inherited the larger share of the land, consisting of the baronies of Dunluce and Kilconway, whereas Alexander, his younger brother, inherited the Barony of Glenarm.

In an effort to cut down on expenses Lord Antrim, as he was now, and his wife the countess relocated to Ireland in 1638. Antrim set up home in his family's traditional seat of Dunluce Castle as one of the wealthiest men in Ireland. He oversaw nearly 340,000 acres of land, which was mostly sublet to tenant farmers. Along with the family's traditional Scottish followers in the Western Isles, Antrim's tenants provided him with an important power base during the coming wars.

Scottish crisis

Antrim Plan 

Due to his family connections there, Antrim took a strong interest in Scottish politics. By 1638 the King's attempts to introduce religious reforms there had led to protests, the signing of a Covenant and eventually armed resistance by the Protestant inhabitants in the Bishops' Wars. Antrim saw in the developing situation an opportunity both to assist the King and to regain his family's traditional lands in Scotland from his hereditary enemy Archibald Campbell, 1st Marquess of Argyll, who had joined the covenanters. He proposed raising an Irish Catholic army from his tenants in Ulster and then crossing the North Channel to Kintyre and the Western Isles where they could link up with the Scottish MacDonalds, many of whom had refused to sign the covenant.

Antrim's proposed expedition would take place in conjunction with other landings and an invasion by the main English army under Charles. The expedition would divert Covenanter troops away from the King's army while in the process Antrim would be able to recover Kintyre, a peninsula in Western Scotland, for his family. Antrim also tied the project to the fears of the Irish government that the covenanters might invade northern Ireland where they enjoyed strong support amongst the Presbyterian settlers. He suggested that an Irish invasion of Scotland would pre-empt this threat. Nonetheless Wentworth in Dublin was extremely sceptical about the plan. He rejected Antrim's appeals for money, supplies and weapons. Wentworth's refusal was likely due to his own plans for the regular Irish Army to launch a rival invasion from Ireland against Dumbarton and his mistrust of the Earl's motives. Eventually, Wentworth was ordered to assist Antrim by the King.

The growing crisis re-ignited the MacDonald-Campbell feud. In response, Argyll raised troops of his own in Scotland and attacked the MacDonalds who were arming in anticipation of Antrim's invasion, driving many into exile in Ireland. The threatened invasion by Irish Catholics also strengthened support in Scotland for the Covenanters, and further damaged the King's reputation there.

New Irish Army 

 Based in Carrickfergus, Antrim began raising his army in December 1638 although it wasn't until April the following year that he formally received a commission from the King authorising him to do so. Antrim recruited his army from many of the leading Gaelic families of Ulster, but Wentworth blocked a plan to import experienced Irish mercenary officers from Europe to command them. The army was raised separately from the existing standing Irish Army, which was more heavily Protestant. The army was to consist of 5,000 infantry and 200 cavalry.

Assembling the force took longer than expected, and by the time it was ready the First Scottish War had been ended by the Treaty of Berwick (1639). This settled relatively little and was closer to a ceasefire than a final agreement. A second war was widely expected, but Antrim had to postpone and then abandon his expedition. Nonetheless, sporadic fighting continued in western Scotland between local MacDonalds and Campbells. Antrim and Wentworth both blamed the other for the delays with the expedition.

In 1640, the Scottish situation flared up again and the Covenanter Army now launched an invasion of England. Antrim's planned expedition was revived, but this time Wentworth himself oversaw the recruitment of an 8,000-strong "New Irish Army" which assembled at Carrickfergus. Like Antrim's earlier force, the army was made up mainly of Irish Catholics. By this time the Scots had captured Newcastle, and were able to agree a favourable peace at the Treaty of Ripon before the Irish army had crossed to Scotland. This effectively left the new Covenanter government intact in Scotland, with Argyll one of its leading figures.

Antrim moved to Dublin during 1640, occasionally attending the Irish House of Lords and generally opposing the policies of Wentworth. In November 1640 Wentworth was recalled to London where he was impeached by Parliament and ultimately executed.

The future of the New Irish Army became a source of controversy once the Scottish crisis ended, as it was alleged that Charles I intended to ship them to England to enforce his will against the London Parliament with whom he was in dispute. Antrim's exact role remains controversial. He later claimed he was contacted by a messenger named Thomas Bourke, on the King's behalf, and encouraged to stop the New Irish Army from disbanding, to raise its strength to 20,000 and to equip it for operations in England. Antrim worked alongside other Irish supporters of the King such as Ormond and Castlehaven and kept in contact with Charles. Some of the other figures Antrim worked with at the time such as Lord Enniskillen were soon to take part in the Irish Rebellion. As the King's political situation in both England and Scotland seemed to improve in 1641, the need for Irish military intervention lessened. Nonetheless, Antrim worked hard to secure support for the King in Ireland, planning to get the Irish Parliament to declare for the King against the English Parliament should fighting break out in England.

Antrim's plan to use Ireland to solve the King's English problems was wrecked by the outbreak of the Irish Rebellion in October 1641.

The New Irish Army remained unpaid in the wake of Strafford's execution, and were waiting to be shipped abroad for foreign service.

Irish Rebellion 
Soon afterwards he returned to Ireland, and sought in 1641 to create a diversion, together with James Butler, 1st Duke of Ormonde, for Charles I against the parliament. He joined in his schemes Lord Slane and Sir Phelim O'Neill, later leaders of the rebellion, but on the outbreak of the Irish Rebellion of 1641 in the autumn he dissociated himself from his allies and retired to his castle at Dunluce (now in Northern Ireland). Although Sir Phelim O'Neill announced in the Proclamation of Dungannon that he had a commission from the King that authorized the rebellion, Antrim remained broadly neutral. He assisted the besieged Protestant garrison during the Siege of Coleraine, persuading his Catholic tenants to abandon the campaign and sending supplies of food to the hard-pressed inhabitants.

His suspicious conduct, however, and his Roman Catholicism, caused him to be regarded as an enemy by the English party. In May 1642 he was captured at Dunluce Castle by the Scottish Covenanter general Robert Monro, and imprisoned at Carrickfergus. Escaping thence he joined the queen at York.

In May 1643, having proceeded to Ireland to negotiate a cessation of hostilities between the English Royalists and Irish Catholic rebels, he was again captured with his papers and confined at Carrickfergus, thence once more escaping and making his way to Kilkenny, the headquarters of the Roman Catholic confederation.

He returned to Oxford in December with a scheme for raising 10,000 Irish for service in England and 2000 to join Montrose in Scotland, which through the influence of the duchess of Buckingham secured the consent of the king. On 26 January 1645 Antrim was elevated from Earl to Marquess of Antrim. He returned to Kilkenny in February, took the Irish Confederate oath of association, and was made a member of the council and lieutenant-general of the forces of the Catholic confederacy. The confederacy, however, giving him no support in his projects, he threw up his commission, and with Ormond's help despatched about 1600 men under his kinsman Alasdair MacColla in June to Montrose's assistance in Scotland, sparking a Scottish civil war. Antrim subsequently returned to Oxford and was sent by the king in 1645 with letters for the queen at Saint-Germain-en-Laye.

He proceeded thence to Flanders and fitted out two frigates with military stores, which he brought to the Prince of Wales at Falmouth. He visited Cork and afterwards in July 1646 joined his troops in Scotland, with the hope of expelling Argyll from Kintyre; but he was obliged to retire by order of the king, and returning to Ireland threw himself into the intrigues between the various factions.

Late in 1647 he was appointed with Muskerry and Geoffrey Browne by the Irish confederacy to negotiate a treaty with the Prince of Wales in France, and though he outmanoeuvred his companions by starting a week before them, he failed to secure the coveted lord-lieutenancy, which was confirmed to Ormond.

Cromwell era 
He now ceased to support the Roman Catholics or the king's cause; opposed the treaty between Ormond and the confederates; supported the project of union between O'Neill and the parliament; and in 1649 entered into communications with Cromwell, for whom he performed various services during the Cromwellian conquest of Ireland, though there appears no authority to support Carte's story that Antrim was the author of a forged agreement for the betrayal of the king's army by Lord Inchiquin (Calendar State Papers Ireland, 1660–1662, pp. 294, 217; Cal. of Clarendon St. Pap., ii. 69, and Gardiner's Commonwealth, i. 153). Subsequently, he joined Ireton, and was present at the Siege of Carlow.

He returned to England in December 1650, and in lieu of his confiscated estate received a pension of £500 and later of £800, together with lands in County Mayo.

Restoration 
After the Restoration of Charles II to the throne in 1660, Antrim went to London to demonstrate his loyalty to the King. Before being able to meet Charles, he was imprisoned in the Tower of London, accused of collaboration with Cromwell and the English Republicans. Antrim was excluded from the Indemnity and Oblivion Act, which offered a pardon for offences that might have been committed during the previous two decades. His long-standing rival Argyll also came to London to swear his loyalty to Charles, and was likewise imprisoned before being taken back to Scotland, tried and executed for treason.

From July 1660 until May 1661 Antrim remained in the Tower. He was investigated by the new Royalist authorities for several offences, particularly allegations that he had taken part in the 1641 Irish Rebellion and that he had publicly suggested Charles I had secret involvement with the rising. He was also accused of a variety of other crimes including specific charges of his dealings with Ireton and other Republican officers during the Irish campaigns. Although all but the first of these accusations were essentially true, Antrim was eventually released without being charged.

Later life 

Despite being cleared, he still faced serious battles to recover his Irish estates. He had to prove that he was innocent of any involvement in the Irish rebellion.

Subsequently, being called before the lords justice in Ireland, In 1663 he succeeded, despite Ormond's opposition, in securing a decree of innocence from the commissioners of claims. This raised an outcry from the adventurers who had been put in possession of his lands, and who procured a fresh trial; but Antrim appealed to the king, and through the influence of the queen mother obtained a pardon, his estates being restored to him by the Irish Act of Explanation in 1665

Antrim was described by Clarendon as "of handsome appearance but of excessive pride and vanity and of a marvellous weak and narrow understanding". He married secondly Rose, daughter of Sir Henry O'Neill, but had no children, being succeeded in the earldom by his brother Alexander, 3rd Earl of Antrim.

Death and timeline 
Lord Antrim died on 3 February 1683. He had married twice but both marriages were childless. The marquessate became extinct and Randal was, therefore, the first and last Marquess of Antrim of the 1645 creation. His brother Alexander succeeded him in the earldom as the 3rd Earl of Antrim.

{|
!colspan=3|Timeline
|-
!align="left"|Age!!align="left"|Date!!align="left"|Event
|-
|0||1609, 9 Jun||Born, probably at Dunluce Castle.
|-
|||1618, 28 May||Father created Viscount Dunluce.
|-
|||1620, 12 Dec||Becomes Viscount Dunluce, as his father is created Earl of Antrim.
|-
|||1625, 27 Mar||Accession of King Charles I, succeeding King James I
|-
|||1632, 12 Jan||Thomas Wentworth, later Earl of Strafford, appointed Lord Deputy of Ireland, succeeding 
|-
|||1635, April||Married Katherine Villiers, the widow of George Villiers, 1st Duke of Buckingham.
|-
|||1636, 10 Dec||Succeeded his father as the 2nd Earl of Antrim'.
|-
|||1640, 28 Oct||The Treaty of Ripon ended the 2nd Bishops' War.
|-
|||1641, 12 May||Strafford beheaded
|-
|||1641, 23 Oct||Outbreak of the Rebellion|-
|||1642||Surprised by Monroe at Dunluce and taken prisoner.
|-
|||1645, 26 Jan||Created Marquess of Antrim.
|-
|||1645, 21 Oct||Giovanni Battista Rinuccini, the papal nuncio, landed in Ireland.|-
|||1646, 5 Jun||Battle of Benburb|-
|||1649, 30 Jan||King Charles I beheaded.|-
|||1660, 29 May||Restoration of King Charles II|-
|||1683, 3 Feb||Died childless, and was succeeded by his brother as the 3rd Earl.
|}

 Notes and references 
 Notes 

 Citations 

 Sources 

 
 
  (for Antrim)
 
  – 1643 to 1660
 
  – Ab-Adam to Basing
  – Scotland and Ireland
 
 
  – (for timeline)
  – 1639 to 1641
  – Aphorismical Discovery, 1641 to 1648
 
 
  – Blood royal, dukes, earls (for Antrim)
 
  – (Snippet view)
 
  – (Preview)
  – Abercorn to Balmerino
  – (Preview)
  – 1641 to 1643
 
 
 

 Further reading 
 – History based on Richard Bellings memoirs

 Hibernia Anglicana, by R. Cox (1689–1690) esp. app. xlix. vol. ii. 206
 Thomason Tracts (Brit. Mus.), E 59 (18), 149 (12), 138 (7), 153 (19), 61 (23)
 Murder will out, or the King's Letter justifying the Marquess of Antrim (1689)
 Hist. MSS. Comm. SerieS-- MSS. of Marq. of Ormonde''

 

MacDonnell
1609 births
1683 deaths
Marquesses of Antrim